Harrow Central was a parliamentary constituency in Harrow, London, which returned one Member of Parliament (MP)  to the House of Commons of the Parliament of the United Kingdom from 1950 until it was abolished for the 1983 general election.

Boundaries
1950–1955: The Urban District of Harrow wards of Harrow-on-the-Hill and Greenhill, Headstone, Wealdstone North, Wealdstone South, and West Harrow.

1955–1974: The Municipal Borough of Harrow wards of Harrow-on-the-Hill and Greenhill, Kenton, Wealdstone North, Wealdstone South, and West Harrow.

1974–1983: The London Borough of Harrow wards of Harrow-on-the-Hill and Greenhill, Kenton, Wealdstone North, Wealdstone South, and West Harrow.

Members of Parliament

Elections

Elections in the 1950s

Elections in the 1960s

Elections in the 1970s

References

 

Parliamentary constituencies in London (historic)
Constituencies of the Parliament of the United Kingdom established in 1950
Constituencies of the Parliament of the United Kingdom disestablished in 1983
Politics of the London Borough of Harrow